People who were born in, residents of, or otherwise closely associated with Trenton include:

Academics

 Charles Conrad Abbott (1843–1919), archaeologist and naturalist
 Ndidiamaka Amutah-Onukagha (born 1981), physician who is the Julia A. Okoro Professor of Black Maternal Health at the Tufts University School of Medicine
 Flournoy Coles (–1982), official of the United States Department of State who was the first Black faculty member to gain tenure at Vanderbilt University
 Timothy Abbott Conrad (1803–1877), geologist and malacologist
 Mary Joyce Doyle (1923–2016), nun and librarian who founded the library consortium that revolutionized the borrowing of books in Bergen County, New Jersey, through the creation of the Bergen County Cooperative Library System
 Robert B. Duffield (1917–2000), radiochemist who headed the Argonne National Laboratory
 N. Gregory Mankiw (born 1958), macroeconomist
 George T. Reynolds (1917–2005), physicist who was best known for his accomplishments in particle physics, biophysics and environmental science
 Joshua M. Zeitz (born 1974), historian

Actors and actresses

 Jean Acker (1893–1978), film actress who was the estranged wife of silent film star Rudolph Valentino
 Betty Bronson (1907–1971), actress
 Roxanne Hart (born 1952), actress who appeared in the film Highlander and on television in Chicago Hope
 Richard Kind (born 1956), actor and voice actor, known for his roles in the sitcoms Mad About You (as Dr. Mark Devanow) and Spin City (as Paul Lassiter)
 Ernie Kovacs (1919–1962), television comedian and film actor
 Judith Light (born 1949), actress
 Amy Locane (born 1971), actress
 Amy Robinson (born 1948), actress and film producer
 Sommore Rambough (born 1967), comedian
 Ty Treadway (born 1967), host of Merv Griffin's Crosswords
 Sammy Williams (1948–2018), actor best known for his role as Paul in the musical A Chorus Line, for which he won the 1976 Tony Award for Best Featured Actor in a Musical

Artists

 Edward Marshall Boehm (1913–1969), sculptor and his wife Helen Boehm (1920–2010), who promoted his works
 Ruth Donnelly (1896–1982), stage and film actress
 Peter Hujar (1934–1987), photographer best known for his black-and-white portraits

Authors, writers, journalists, poets

 Edward Bloor (born 1950), novelist
 Edward Y. Breese (1912–1979), popular fiction writer
 John Brooks (1920–1993), writer and longtime contributor to The New Yorker magazine
 Russell Gordon Carter (1892–1957), writer
 Janis Hirsch (born ) is a comedy writer best known for producing and writing for television series
 Pam Houston (born 1962), author of short stories, novels and essays who is best known for her first book, Cowboys Are My Weakness
 Mary Dagworthy James (1810–1883), hymn writer
 William Mastrosimone (born 1947), playwright
 Mark Osborne (born 1970) film director, writer, producer and animator, whose work includes Kung Fu Panda
 Ion Hanford Perdicaris (1840–1925) playwright and author wrote about art and Moroccon culture
 Bob Ryan (born 1946), sportswriter, regular contributor on the ESPN show Around the Horn
 Ntozake Shange (1948–2018), playwright and poet best known for the Obie Award-winning play For Colored Girls Who Have Considered Suicide / When the Rainbow Is Enuf
 Geraldine Sharpe (1929–1968), photographer best known for her photographs of landscapes and of Ghana
 Nancy Wood (1936–2013), author, poet and photographer

Colonial figures

 James Francis Armstrong (1750–1816), chaplain in the American Revolutionary War and a Presbyterian minister for 30 years in Trenton
 Samuel John Atlee (1739–1786), soldier and statesman who was a delegate to the Continental Congress for Pennsylvania
 John Cadwalader (1742–1786), commander of Pennsylvania troops during the American Revolutionary War
 Lambert Cadwalader (1742–1823), merchant who fought in the Revolutionary War, then represented New Jersey in the Continental Congress and the United States House of Representatives
 Thomas Cadwalader (1707–1779), physician and namesake of Cadwalader Park
 Philemon Dickinson (1739–1809), lawyer and politician who served as a brigadier general of the New Jersey militia, as a Continental Congressman from Delaware and a United States Senator from New Jersey
 Mary Hays (1744–1832), woman who fought during the Revolutionary War at the Battle of Monmouth, and is generally believed to have been the inspiration of the story of Molly Pitcher

Government, education and politics

 Samuel Alito (born 1950), Associate Justice of the U.S. Supreme Court
 Henry W. Antheil Jr. (1912–1940), American diplomat killed in the shootdown of the Kaleva airplane by Soviet aircraft in the wake of the Soviet occupation of the Baltic States
 John T. Bird (1829–1911), represented New Jersey's 3rd congressional district (1869–1873)
 James Bishop (1816–1895), represented  in the U.S. House of Representatives (1855–1857)
 Peggy Blackford (born 1942), American Ambassador to Guinea-Bissau from 1995 until relations were suspended in June 1998
 Joseph L. Bocchini Jr. (born 1944), politician who served in the New Jersey General Assembly from the 14th Legislative District from 1982 to 1988
 J. Hart Brewer (1844–1900), represented New Jersey's 2nd congressional district (1881–1885)
 Frank O. Briggs (1851–1913), politician who was the mayor of Trenton from 1899 to 1902, and United States Senator from New Jersey from 1907 to 1913
 Michele Brown, CEO of the New Jersey Economic Development Authority
 James Buchanan (1839–1900), represented New Jersey's 2nd congressional district from 1885 to 1893
 Newton A.K. Bugbee (1876–1965), businessman and politician who served as New Jersey State Comptroller and chairman of the New Jersey Republican State Committee, and was the Republican candidate for Governor of New Jersey in 1919
 Robert J. Burkhardt (1916–1999), politician who served as Secretary of State of New Jersey and chairman of the New Jersey Democratic State Committee
 Aneesh Chopra (born 1972), served as the first Chief Technology Officer of the United States
 James L. Conger (1805–1876), politician who represented Michigan's 3rd congressional district
 Martin Connor (born 1945), former member of the New York State Senate
 Willard S. Curtin (1905–1996), member of the United States House of Representatives from Pennsylvania
 William Lewis Dayton Jr. (1839–1897), United States Ambassador to the Netherlands
 Wayne DeAngelo (born 1965), politician who has served in the New Jersey General Assembly since 2008, where he represents the 14th Legislative District
 David Dinkins (1927–2020), first black mayor of New York City
 George Washington Doane (1799–1859), churchman, educator (founder of Doane Academy) and bishop in the Episcopal Church for the Diocese of New Jersey
 Frederick W. Donnelly (1866–1935), politician who served as Mayor of Trenton from 1911 until 1932
 Richard Grant Augustus Donnelly (1841–1905), politician who served as Mayor of Trenton from 1884 to 1886
 Thomas A. Ferguson (born 1950), Director of the Bureau of Engraving and Printing from 1998 to 2005
 Richard Funkhouser (1917–2008), geologist and diplomat who served as United States Ambassador to Gabon
 Harry Heher (1889–1972), Justice on the New Jersey Supreme Court
 Charles R. Howell (1904–1973), represented  in the U.S. House of Representatives (1949–1955)
 Elijah C. Hutchinson (1855–1932), represented  (1915–1923)
 Marie Hilson Katzenbach (1882–1970), educator who was the first woman to serve as president of the New Jersey State Board of Education
 Nicholas Katzenbach (1922–2012), U.S. Attorney General during the Johnson Administration
 Dick LaRossa (born 1946), politician and former television presenter who served two terms in the New Jersey Senate, where he represented the 15th Legislative District
 A. Leo Levin (1919–2015), law professor at the University of Pennsylvania Law School
 Sol Linowitz (1913–2005), diplomat, lawyer, and businessman
 Moira K. Lyons, politician who served as a member of the Connecticut House of Representatives from 1981 to 2004
 Francis J. McManimon (1926–2020), politician who served in the New Jersey General Assembly from 1972 to 1982 and in the New Jersey Senate from 1982 to 1992
 Joseph P. Merlino (1922–1998), politician who served as President of the New Jersey Senate from 1978 to 1981
 A. Dayton Oliphant (1887–1963), associate justice of the New Jersey Supreme Court from 1945 to 1946, and again from 1948 to 1957
 Anne M. Patterson (born 1959), associate justice of the New Jersey Supreme Court
 Gregory Anthony Perdicaris (1810–1883), first U.S. Consul to Greece
 D. Lane Powers (1896–1968), represented  in the U.S. House of Representatives (1933–1945)
 Verlina Reynolds-Jackson, politician who represents the 15th Legislative District in the New Jersey General Assembly
 Daniel Bailey Ryall (1798–1864), U.S. Representative from New Jersey (1839–1841)
 Antonin Scalia (1936–2016), Associate Justice of the U.S. Supreme Court
 Sido L. Ridolfi (1913–2004), politician who served in the New Jersey Senate from 1954 to 1972
 Charles Skelton (1806–1879), represented  (1851–1855)
 Robin L. Titus (born 1954), physician and politician who serves as a Republican member of the Nevada Assembly
 Wesley Updike (1900–1974), educator and soldier, who was the father of author John Updike.
 Bennet Van Syckel (1830–1921), associate justice of the New Jersey Supreme Court from 1869 to 1904
 Albert C. Wagner (1911–1987), director of the New Jersey Department of Corrections from 1966 to 1973
 Allan B. Walsh (1874–1953), represented the 4th congressional district (1913–1915)
 Karl Weidel (1923–1997), who served in the New Jersey General Assembly from 1970 to 1986
 Ira W. Wood (1856–1931), represented  (1904–1913)

Military

 Stephen Hart Barlow (1895–1962), served as Quartermaster General of New Jersey from 1934 to 1942
 Clifford Bluemel (1885–1973), United States Army brigadier general who commanded the 31st Division during the Battle of Bataan before being captured by Japanese forces and held as a prisoner of war
 Thomas McCall Cadwalader (1795–1873), United States Army Major general
 Frank William Crilley (1883–1947), United States Navy diver and a recipient of the Medal of Honor
 Samuel Gibbs French (1818–1910), Major General in the Confederate States Army
 William J. Johnston (1918–1990), Medal of Honor recipient for gallantry during World War II
 Needham Roberts (1901–1949), soldier in the Harlem Hellfighters and recipient of the Purple Heart and the Croix de Guerre for his valor during World War I
 Norman Schwarzkopf Jr. (1934–2012), Commander-in-Chief of the U.S. Central Command in the Gulf War
 Peter D. Vroom (1842–1926), Inspector General of the U.S. Army

Music

 George Antheil (1900–1959), pianist, composer, writer and inventor
 Hodgy Beats (born 1990 as Gerard Damien Long), member of the Los Angeles hip-hop collective Odd Future
 Carman (born 1956), contemporary Christian music singer
 Shawn Corey Carter (born 1969, a.k.a. Jay-Z), rap mogul, CEO
 Charles Chapman (1950–2011), jazz guitarist
 Richie Cole (1948–2020), jazz alto saxophonist
 Johnny Coles (1926–1997), jazz trumpeter
 Richard Crooks (1900–1972), tenor at the New York Metropolitan Opera
 Sarah Dash (1944–2021), singer, formerly of glam rock group, Labelle
 Nona Hendryx (born 1944), singer formerly of glam rock group Labelle
 Wise Intelligent, and other members of the hip hop group Poor Righteous Teachers
 Maury Muehleisen (1949–1973), guitarist and songwriting partner for Jim Croce
 Marion Zarzeczna, concert pianist

Sports

 Terrance Bailey (born 1965), former basketball player who led NCAA Division I in scoring playing for Wagner College in 1985–1986
 Bo Belinsky (1936–2001), professional baseball player
 Elvin Bethea (born 1946), Pro Football Hall of Fame defensive end who played his entire NFL career with the Houston Oilers
 Mike Bloom (1915–1993), professional basketball player for the Baltimore Bullets, Boston Celtics, Minneapolis Lakers and Chicago Stags
 Steve Braun (born 1948), professional baseball player
 Tal Brody (born 1943), Euroleague basketball shooting guard, drafted # 12 in the NBA draft
 Antron Brown (born c. 1976), drag racer who became the sport's first African American champion when he won the 2012 Top Fuel National Hot Rod Association championship
 Ji'Ayir Brown, American football safety for the Penn State Nittany Lions 
 Wally Campbell (1926–1954), stock car, midget, and sprint car racer who was the 1951 NASCAR Modified champion
 George Case (1915–1989), outfielder who played for the Washington Senators
 Terrance Cauthen (born 1976), lightweight boxer who won a bronze medal at the 1996 Summer Olympics
 Al Clark (born 1948), former professional baseball umpire who worked in 3,392 major league games in his 26-year career
 Donald Cogsville (born 1965), former soccer player who earned six caps with the U.S. national team and is CEO of a real estate investment firm
 Gwynneth Coogan (born 1965), former Olympic athlete, educator and mathematician
 Albert Cooper (1904–1993), U.S. Olympic soccer goalkeeper in 1928 who later served in the New Jersey General Assembly.
 Hollis Copeland (born 1955), former professional basketball player who played for the New York Knicks
 Narciso Crook (born 1995), professional baseball outfielder for the Chicago Cubs.
 Harry Deane (1846–1925), early professional baseball player
 J. J. Dillon (born 1945), former professional wrestler
 Dan Donigan (born 1967), former professional soccer player
 Al Downing (born 1941), professional baseball player
 John Easton (1933–2001), baseball player who played briefly for the Philadelphia Phillies
 Nick Frascella (1914–2000), basketball player who played in the National Basketball League for the Akron Goodyear Wingfoots
 Dave Gallagher (born 1960), professional baseball player
 Samuel Goss (born 1947), boxerwho competed in the men's bantamweight event at the 1968 Summer Olympics
 Greg Grant (born 1966), NBA basketball player
 Mel Groomes (1927–1997), football player and baseball coach who played for the Detroit Lions
 Thomas Hardiman (born 1947), former handball player who competed in the 1972 Summer Olympics in Munich
 Jacke Healey (born 1988), college baseball coach and former shortstop who is co-head coach of the Oakland Golden Grizzlies baseball team
 Roy Hinson (born 1961), professional basketball player
 Dahntay Jones (born 1980), professional basketball player
 Patrick Kerney (born 1976), defensive end who played in the NFL for the Atlanta Falcons and Seattle Seahawks
 Tad Kornegay (born 1982) defensive back for the Saskatchewan Roughriders and BC Lions of the Canadian Football League
 Brandel Littlejohn, professional wrestler who competes for Ring of Honor, where he performs under the ring name "Cheeseburger"
 Lawrence Low (1920–1996), sailor who received a gold medal in the star class with the boat Kathleen at the 1956 Summer Olympics in Melbourne.
 Kareem McKenzie (born 1979), offensive tackle for the New York Giants of the National Football League
 Bob Milacki (born 1964), former MLB pitcher who played mostly with the Baltimore Orioles
 Karin Miller (born 1977), former professional tennis player
 Athing Mu (born 2002), gold medalist in the 800 meters at the 2020 Summer Olympics in Tokyo.
 George Nemchik (1915–1988), soccer playerwho competed with the U.S. national team and was a member of the 1936 U.S. Olympic Soccer team.
 Keith Newell (born 1988), football offensive lineman for the Philadelphia Soul of the Arena Football League
 Gail Peters (born 1929), former competition swimmer who represented the United States at the 1952 Summer Olympics in Helsinki in the 200-meter breaststroke.
 Myles Powell (born 1997), basketball player for the Seton Hall Pirates men's basketball team
 Duane Robinson (born 1968), retired professional soccer forward who played in the American Professional Soccer League and the United States Interregional Soccer League
 Dennis Rodman (born 1961), professional basketball player
 Bobby Sanguinetti (born 1988), professional ice hockey defenseman who plays for HC Lugano in the National League
 Carlijn Schoutens (born 1994), Dutch-American speed skater who qualified for the U.S. team at the 2018 Winter Olympics in the women's 3,000-meter event
 Gary Stills (born 1974), professional American football player
 La'Keisha Sutton (born 1990), professional basketball player for the Harlem Globetrotters<ref>Parker, L.A.. "The former South Carolina University star via Trenton Catholic Academy requested a rebounder then showed the genesis of her nickname.", The Trentonian', February 26, 2019. Accessed May 18, 2022.</ref>
 Alphonso Taylor (born 1969), defensive tackle who played in the NFL for the Denver Broncos
 Curtis Thompson (born 1996), track and field athlete who specializes in the javelin
 Vince Thompson (born 1957), former professional football running back who played in the NFL for the Detroit Lions
 Mike Tiernan (1867–1918), major league baseball player
 Dantouma Toure (born 2004), soccer player who plays as a winger for New York Red Bulls II in the USL Championship via the New York Red Bulls Academy
 Troy Vincent (born 1971), former professional football player, president of the NFL Players Association
 Charlie Weis (born 1956), head coach of the Notre Dame Fighting Irish football team from 2005 to 2009
 Nick Werkman (born ), basketball player for the Seton Hall Pirates, who led the NCAA in scoring in 1962–1963 and was in the top three nationally on his two other collegiate seasons

Others

 Orfeo Angelucci (1912–1993), contactee who claimed to be in ongoing contact with extraterrestrial beings
 Anthony Balaam (born 1965), serial killer known as The Trenton Strangler
 Geoffrey Berman (born 1959), lawyer currently serving as the Interim United States Attorney for the Southern District of New York
 Jude Burkhauser (1947–1998), artist, museum curator and researcher
 Emily Roebling Cadwalader (1879–1941), Philadelphia socialite and yacht owner
 John Lambert Cadwalader (1836–1914), lawyer who was a name partner of Cadwalader, Wickersham & Taft
 Jon Caldara, libertarian activist who serves as the president of the Independence Institute
 Bernard Cywinski (1940–2011), architect who designed the Liberty Bell Center at Independence National Historical Park
 Mathias J. DeVito (–2019), businessperson and lawyer who served as the president and chief executive officer of The Rouse Company
 Matthew Edward Duke (1915–1960), pilot who turned to making a living off flying anti-Castro Cubans to exile in the United States for $1,000 a job
 Brian Duperreault (born 1947), CEO of AIG
 Harrington Emerson (1853–1931), efficiency engineer and business theorist
 Al Herpin (1862–1947), known as the "Man Who Never Slept"
 Edward Kmiec (1936–2020), retired Roman Catholic Bishop of Buffalo
 Jonathan LeVine (born 1968), owner of Jonathan LeVine GalleryStrausbaugh, John. "Street Art That's Finding A New Address", The New York Times, March 7, 2010. Accessed July 2, 2018. "Mr. LeVine came to the movement the same way his artists did. He grew up in Trenton and earned a degree in sculpture, but he was less attracted to fine art than he was to underground comics, punk and hip-hop, 'anything subculture and edgy.' With a loan from his parents, he opened his first small art gallery in New Hope, Pa., in 2001."
 Thomas Maddock (1818–1899), inventor and potter who started the American indoor toilet industry
 J. Lee Nicholson (1863–1924), accountant, consultant and lecturer, considered to be the father of cost accounting in the United States
 Zebulon Pike (1779–1813), explorer and namesake of Pikes Peak
 Joe J. Plumeri (born 1944), chairman and CEO of Willis Group and owner of the Trenton Thunder
 Bruce Ritter (1927–1999), Catholic priest and one-time Franciscan friar who founded the charity Covenant House in 1972 for homeless teenagers and led it until he was forced to resign in 1990
 Frank D. Schroth (1884–1974), owner of the Brooklyn Eagle, had earlier worked as a reporter at The Times Thomas N. Schroth (1921–2009), editor of Congressional Quarterly and founder of The National Journal''
 Victor W. Sidel (1931–2018), physician who was one of the co-founders of Physicians for Social Responsibility in 1961
 Pat Spirito (1939–1983), soldier and hitman for the Philadelphia Crime Family
 Robert Stempel (1933–2011), chairman and CEO of General Motors
 Margaret E. Thompson (1911–1992), numismatist specializing in Greek coins
 Irvin Ungar (born 1948), former pulpit rabbi and antiquarian bookseller, considered the foremost expert on the artist Arthur Szyk
 Albert W. Van Duzer (1917–1999), bishop of the Episcopal Diocese of New Jersey, serving from 1973 to 1982
 Ken Wolski (born 1948), registered nurse, marijuana legalization advocate and 2012 Green Party nominee for U.S. Senate

References

 
Trenton